Mark Adams (born May 14, 1956) is an American college basketball coach who was most recently the coach of the Texas Tech Red Raiders men's basketball team.

Coaching career
After playing basketball at South Plains College, Adams transferred to Texas Tech, where he served as a student assistant to head coach Gerald Myers. After graduating from Texas Tech in 1979, Adams landed his first college coaching job at Clarendon College, where he stayed for two seasons and posted 46 victories. From 1983 to 1987 he served as the head coach at Wayland Baptist, where went 100–39 overall and led the Pioneers to the 1985 NAIA title game. Adams would move on to become the head coach at West Texas A&M where he'd guide the Buffaloes to two NCAA Division II tournament appearances and compile an overall record of 108–40. In 1992, Adams accepted the Texas–Pan American job, where in five seasons he recorded a 44–90 record.   

After taking time away from coaching to become the owner of the Lubbock Cotton Kings hockey team, Adams would return to basketball coaching in 2004 when he was named the head coach at Howard College. While at Howard, Adams guided the team to 233 victories, as well as a program-record 36 wins in a single season and nine consecutive NJCAA regional tournament appearances highlighted by the 2010 NJCAA Championship and a roster featuring Jae Crowder. 

In 2013, Adams joined Texas Tech's staff as the director of basketball operations under Tubby Smith, a position he'd hold for two seasons before joining Chris Beard as an assistant coach at Little Rock. In his one season as an assistant with the Trojans, Adams was part of the team's 2016 regular season and Sun Belt tournament titles, along with the school's upset win over fifth-seeded Purdue in the 2016 NCAA tournament. Adams would follow Beard back to Texas Tech as an assistant coach, and has been part of three NCAA tournament squads including national runner-up in 2019.

After Beard's departure to Texas, Adams was promoted to the Red Raiders head coaching position on April 5, 2021.

Adams led Texas Tech to a 27–10 record and the NCAA tournament in his first season at the helm, reaching the Sweet Sixteen where they lost to Duke. In 2022–23, Tech finished the season with a 16–15 record and a ninth-place finish in the Big 12.

On March 5, 2023, Adams was suspended by the university over an alleged "inappropriate, unacceptable, and racially insensitive comment" that he had made to a player the previous week. In an attempt to make the player more receptive to his coaching, Adams "referenced Bible verses about workers, teachers, parents, and slaves serving their masters."

On March 8, 2023, Adams resigned from Texas Tech.

Head coaching record

NCAA DI

NCAA DII

NJCAA

NAIA

References

Living people
1956 births
American men's basketball coaches
Basketball coaches from Texas
College men's basketball head coaches in the United States
Howard Hawks men's basketball coaches
Junior college men's basketball coaches in the United States
Little Rock Trojans men's basketball coaches
People from Brownfield, Texas
South Plains Texans basketball players
UT Rio Grande Valley Vaqueros men's basketball coaches
Texas Tech Red Raiders basketball coaches
Texas Tech University alumni
West Texas A&M Buffaloes basketball coaches